Jacques Sapir is a French economist, born in 1954 in Puteaux. He is the son of psychoanalyst Michel Sapir.

Career
Since 1996, he has been the director of studies at École des Hautes Études en Sciences Sociales (EHESS) in Paris, and head of the Centre d'Étude des Modes d'Industrialisation (CEMI-EHESS). He is a theoretician of economic science noted for his heterodox positions on many issues.

He specializes in the economy of Russia, and teaches at the Moscow School of Economics (Moskovskaya Shkola Ekonomiki). He is also an expert in questions of strategy and defence, and a specialist of the Soviet and Russian military. Recently, he has taken position in favor of deglobalization, questioned the future of the eurozone, and has raised the issue of the eventual necessity for France to leave the eurozone. He is a well-known specialist of Russia's economy and one of the most famous and influential heterodox economists of France.

Bibliography

Books
 Pays de l'est : vers la crise généralisée ?, Federop, Lyon, 1980
 Travail et travailleurs en URSS, La Découverte, Paris, 1984
 Le Système militaire soviétique, La Découverte, Paris, 1988 (Prix Castex en 1989). Cet ouvrage a été publié en anglais en 1991
 L'Économie mobilisée, La Découverte, Paris, 1989
 Les Fluctuations économiques en URSS, 1941-1985, Paris, Éditions de l'EHESS, 1989
 Feu le système soviétique ?, La Découverte, Paris, 1992
 Le Chaos russe, La Découverte, Paris, 1996
 La Mandchourie oubliée : grandeur et démesure de l'art de la guerre soviétique, Éditions du Rocher, 1996. Critique sur 
 Le Krach russe, La Découverte, Paris, 1998
 Les Trous noirs de la science économique : essai sur l'impossibilité de penser le temps et l'argent, Albin Michel, Paris, 2000 (Prix Turgot en 2001)
 K Ekonomitcheskoj teorii neodnorodnyh sistem - opyt issledovanija decentralizovannoj ekonomiki (Théorie économique des systèmes hétérogènes: essai sur l'étude des économies décentralisées), Éditions du Haut Collège d'économie, Moscou, 2001 (ouvrage original, non traduit en français)
 Les Économistes contre la démocratie, Albin Michel, Paris, 2002
 Quelle économie pour le XXIe siècle ?, Odile Jacob, Paris, 2005
 La Fin de l'eurolibéralisme, Le Seuil, 2006
 Le nouveau XXIe siècle, du siècle américain au retour des nations, Le Seuil, 2008
 « The social roots of the financial crisis : implications for Europe » in C. Degryze, (ed)  Social Developments in the European Union : 2008, ETUI, Bruxelles, 2009
 Ch. 8, « Le vrai sens du terme. Le libre-échange ou la mise en concurrence entre les Nations » et Ch.9, « La mise en concurrence financière des territoires. La finance mondiale et les États » in D. Colle, (ed.), D’un protectionnisme l’autre – La fin de la mondialisation , Presses Universitaires de France, 2009
 1940 - Et si la France avait continué la guerre..., Tallandier, 2010. Co-écrit avec Franck Stora et Loïc Mahé.
 La démondialisation, Le Seuil, 2011
 "Faut-il sortir de l’euro ?", Le Seuil, 2012
 La transition russe, vingt ans après, with V. Ivanter, D. Kuvalin et A. Nekipelov, Paris, éditions des Syrtes, 2012
 "Les scenarii de dissolution de l'euro", Fondation Res Publica, 2013

Recent articles
 « La Crise de l’Euro : erreurs et impasses de l’Européisme » in Perspectives Républicaines, n°2, Juin 2006, pp. 69–84.
 « What Should the Inflation rate Be ? (on the importance of a long-standing discussion for defining today’s development strategy for Russia) » in Studies on Russian Economic Development, Vol. 17, n°3 / Mai 2006.
 « Retour vers le futur : le protectionnisme est-il notre avenir ? » in L’Économie Politique, n°31, 3ème Trimestre, 2006.
 « Crises et désordres monétaires dans le système russe et soviétique », in B. Théret (under the direction of), La Monnaie dévoilée par ses crises, Éditions des l’École des hautes études en sciences sociales, Paris, vol. 2,  2007 pp. 81–116.
 « Global finance in Crisis : a provisional account of the ‘subprime’ crisis and how we got into it », Real-world economics review, issue no. 46, 18 May 2008.
 « The Osseto-Georgian crisis: who trapped whom?» 5 September 2008
 « Sept jours qui ébranlèrent la finance  », Actualités de la Recherche en histoire visuelle, 22 septembre 2008.
 « Une décade prodigieuse. La crise financière entre temps court et temps long » in Varia - n⁰3, 2éme semestre 2008 - Revue de la régulation
 « Le monde qui vient  », Actualités de la Recherche en histoire visuelle, 25 octobre 2008.
 Postface to Que reste-t-il de notre victoire ? - Russie-Occident : le malentendu, par N. Narotchnitskaïa, éd. des Syrtes, 2008.
 « From Financial Crisis to Turning Point. How the US »Subprime Crisis« Turned into a Worldwide One and will Change the Global Economy» in "Internationale Politik und Gesellschaft", n° 1 / 2009.
 « Le contexte économique des élections européennes » in "Revue Politique et Parlementaire", n° 1052, juillet-septembre 2009
 "la démondialisation", 2011
 « How Papandreou could have avoided the Merkozy diktat,» November 7, 2011

See also
 Institutional economics
 Sovietology

References

External links
 Jacques Sapir's blog, with numerous articles in English
 Presentation of Jacques Sapir on the site of EHESS
 "J'ai dû louper un épisode..." an interview by Pascale Fourier
 "L’histoire navrante, mais pourtant révélatrice, d’une interview manquée pour le bulletin du PS." Un article de Jacques Sapir sur le PS et une certaine forme de censure.
 "Les VRAIES raisons de la crise" une affaire de fiscalité mal ficelée.
 La concurrence, un mythe Article de Jacques Sapir sur le mythe de la concurrence.
 Cinq leçons d'une élection Reflexions by Jacques Sapir on the results of the European elections of June 7, 2009.
 "S'il faut vraiment sortir de l'euro" Work sheet detailing the process which would allow France to leave the euro
 [http://manifestepourundebatsurlelibreechange.eu/ Manifeste pour un débat sur le libre-échange, website animated notably by Jacques Sapir, Emmanuel Todd, Jean-Luc Gréau et Hervé Juvin

1954 births
Living people
People from Puteaux
French economists
French sociologists
Academic staff of the School for Advanced Studies in the Social Sciences
Foreign Members of the Russian Academy of Sciences
Academic staff of the Higher School of Economics